Woolley Bridge is an area in Glossopdale, on the border of Greater Manchester and Derbyshire in England. It lies 10 miles from Manchester city centre. It is in the ward of Hadfield South.
Nearby places include Hollingworth, Dinting Vale, Gamesley, Glossop and Mottram.

See also
List of places in Derbyshire

References

External links

Towns and villages of the Peak District
Villages in Derbyshire
High Peak, Derbyshire